The University of Helmstedt (official Latin name: Academia Julia, "Julius University"), was a university in Helmstedt in the Duchy of Brunswick-Wolfenbüttel that existed from 1576 until 1810.

History
Founded by and named after Duke Julius of Brunswick-Wolfenbüttel on 15 October 1576, the first university of the duchy and the first Protestant university of the northern Holy Roman Empire quickly became one of the largest German universities. In order to train pastors and administrators for work in the Lutheran churches, the duchy needed a university of its own. In 1575, Julius obtained the Emperor's permission to open a university in Helmstedt. One year later the first lectures started. The princes of Wolfenbüttel held the office of the rector, starting with Julius' 12-year-old son John Henry.

Tilemann Heshusius was an important early Lutheran theologian at Helmstedt. He developed a clergy network in the region that supported other Helmstedt professors, including Daniel Hofmann, Gottfried Schulter, Basilius Sattler, and Tilemann's son, Heinrich Heshusius.

The university developed four faculties for theology, law, medicine and philosophy including the seven liberal arts. The great auditorium, the Juleum Novum, was erected in 1592.

In the late 18th century, Helmstedt lost popularity to newer universities, such as the University of Göttingen. It was closed in 1810 on initiative of Johannes von Müller, director of public instruction in the Kingdom of Westphalia.

Famous professors and students in Helmstedt
Famous professors include:

 Giordano Bruno, philosophy
 Georgius Calixtus, theology
 Hermann Conring, natural philosophy and rhetoric, medicine, politics (in succession)  
 Hermann von der Hardt, oriental languages
 Lorenz Heister, medicine
Tilemann Heshusius, theology
 Anton August Heinrich Lichtenstein, oriental languages
 Duncan Liddel, mathematics (from 1591 to 1607)
 Heinrich Meibom, history and poetry
 Johann Friedrich Pfaff, mathematics
 Wilhelm Abraham Teller, theology

Famous students include:

 Caspar Abel, theologian
 Valens Acidalius, writer
 Anton Wilhelm Amo, first black student in Europe
 Johann Arndt, theologian
 Christian Heinrich Bünger, anatomist
 Sethus Calvisius, musician
 Joachim Heinrich Campe, writer
 David Caspari, theologian
 Carl Friedrich Gauss, mathematician
 Wilhelm Gesenius, philologist
 Carl Benedict Hase, classicist
 Hoffmann von Fallersleben, writer
 Johann Georg Jacobi, writer
 Augustus Quirinus Rivinus (August Bachmann), physician and botanist

See also
 List of early modern universities in Europe

References

External links

District of Helmstedt - The University (in German)

 
Helmstedt
1576 establishments in the Holy Roman Empire
1810 disestablishments in Germany
Helmstedt
Principality of Brunswick-Wolfenbüttel
Protestant universities and colleges in Europe